Astral may refer to:

Concepts of the non-physical

 Astral body, a subtle body posited by many religious philosophers
 Astral journey (or astral trip), the same as having an out-of-body experience
 Astral plane (AKA astral world), a plane of existence postulated by classical (particularly neo-Platonic), medieval, oriental and esoteric philosophies and mystery religions
 Astral projection, a controversial interpretation of out-of-body experiences
 A ghost or spirit

Entertainment

 Astral, a Magic: The Gathering gaming set
 Astral (band), a dream pop band
 Astral (film), a British horror film
 The Astral (novel), a book by Kate Christensen
 Astral (wrestler) (born 1989), Mexican Mini-Estrella professional wrestler
 Astral Weeks, a 1968 album by Van Morrison
 Astral, a character in the anime and manga series Yu-Gi-Oh! Zexal
Princess Astral, lead character in the cancelled sitcom The Other Kingdom

Companies

 Astral Aviation, a cargo airline based in Nairobi, Kenya
 Astral Media, a Canadian media corporation
 Astral Telecom, a Romanian company
 Astral Oil Works, American producers of Astral Oil

Other

 Astral Apartments, a historic apartment building in Brooklyn, New York
 Astral character, a Unicode concept
 Astral microtubules, a sub population of microtubules
 Astral propagation model a US Navy underwater sound propagation loss model
 Astral (1923 automobile), a British car of the 1920s
 Swing Astral, a German paraglider design

See also
 
 
 Astralwerks, an American-based record label
 Astro (disambiguation)